John Rees (born 1957) is a British political activist, academic, journalist and writer who is a national officer of the Stop the War Coalition, and founding member of Counterfire. He is currently a Visiting Research Fellow at Goldsmiths, University of London.

He was formerly a leading member of the Socialist Workers Party and, as an SWP member, was heavily involved in Respect – The Unity Coalition. His books include Timelines, a political history of the modern world and A People's History of London, co-authored with his partner Lindsey German. He also produces documentaries and presents current affairs programmes for the Islam Channel.

Early life and education

Rees was born in Wiltshire, in South-West England, and was brought up and educated in Chippenham. His father, William Rees was from Aberdare, South Wales, and was a lifelong trade union activist and Labour Party member. His mother, Margaret Rees (Shipley) Rees was from Darlington. 

Rees' first degree was in Politics from Portsmouth Polytechnic and he subsequently undertook research on Hegel and Marx at Hull University under Dr (now Lord) Bhikhu Parekh. The result of that research, The Algebra of Revolution, was published by Routledge in 1998. When Georg Lukacs' unknown manuscript "Tailism and the Dialectic" was discovered and published by Verso Books in 2000, Rees provided the introduction to the volume. He holds a doctorate on 'Leveller organisation and the dynamic of the English Revolution' from Goldsmiths, University of London.

Politics
Elected a member of the National Executive of the National Union of Students in the early 1980s, Rees is a former member of the Socialist Workers Party, and was for many years on its Central Committee. He was editor of the quarterly journal International Socialism for ten years and the organiser of the SWP's annual Marxism festival in 1982–1983 and again from 1992–2002.

A co-founder and a current national officer for the Stop the War Coalition, he has been a central organiser of all its marches including that of 15 February 2003. According to Rees, "Socialists should unconditionally stand with the oppressed against the oppressor, even if the people who run the oppressed country are undemocratic and persecute minorities, like Saddam Hussein." At the same time Rees has always advocated an unrelenting struggle against pro-Western dictators by the people of oppressed countries and to that end Rees became vice president (Europe) of the Cairo Anti-war Conference which rallied opposition forces against the Mubarak dictatorship in Egypt.

He was at the top of Respect – The Unity Coalition's list in the West Midlands region for the 2004 European election and the Respect candidate for the Birmingham Hodge Hill by-election. He also stood for Respect in the 2006 local election in the Bethnal Green South ward of Tower Hamlets in East London, where he came second to Labour. Rees was not selected by the SWP Central Committee to be on the slate for re-election and did not stand independently at the January 2009 conference. Shortly after his partner Lindsey German resigned from the SWP in 2010, Rees and 41 other members followed disenchanted with the party's direction, internal regime and approach to united fronts (18 others who had resigned in weeks prior also supported the resignations).

In 2012, A People's History of London, which Rees co-authored with Lindsey German, was published. The book is a history of London radicalism which documents working (or lower) class struggles in London from the Romans to the present day. Jerry White in The Guardian wrote: "Those who continue to uphold London's living traditions of protest will be able to take heart from this fresh and welcome look at the city's history." White described the book as "a very selective people's history" which does not cover the bombings committed by the IRA and by Islamists on 7 July 2005. Jo Lo Dicio in The Independent on Sunday wrote: "Had these two been political pamphleteers through the ages, one doubts many revolutionary sparks would ever have been lit."

A book on the Levellers and the English Revolution based on his doctoral research was published by Verso in 2016. Rees is currently active in the organisation Counterfire for which he has written two short books, Strategy and Tactics and alongside Joseph Daher The People Demand: A short history of the Arab revolutions. He participated in and reported on the Egyptian revolution in 2011 about which he made two TV documentaries, Inside the Egyptian Revolution and Egypt in Revolution. For the Islam Channel, he is the writer and presenter of the political history documentary series Timeline and a presenter of The Report and Politics and Media current affairs programmes. He has appeared as a political commentator in Ken Loach's The Spirit of '45 and in Amir Amarani's We Are Many.

In September 2013, Iain Dale and a panel for The Daily Telegraph placed him at 85 in a list of the 100 most influential British left-wingers. Around this time, Rees was the founder and organising committee member of The People's Assembly.

In 2016, Rees toured the UK to support Jeremy Corbyn's bid to become Prime Minister.

Selected works

Articles
"Trotsky and the Dialectic of History" International Socialism Journal no. 47, Summer 1990, pp. 113–135.
"Engels's Marxism" International Socialism 2:65, Winter 1994.
"The Socialist Revolution and the Democratic Revolution" Issue 83 of INTERNATIONAL SOCIALISM JOURNAL Published Summer 1999
"Tony Cliff: Theory and Practice" International Socialism Journal 87, Summer 2000.

Books
Socialism and War (1990)
The ABC of Socialism (1994) 
Marxism and the New Imperialism (1994) (editor and contributor) 
In Defence of October: A Debate on the Russian Revolution (with others including Robin Blackburn) (1997) 
The Algebra of Revolution: The Dialectic and the Classical Marxist Tradition (1998) 
Essays on Historical Materialism (editor) (1998) 
Imperialism and Resistance (2006) 
The People Demand, a short history of the Arab revolutions (with Joseph Daher)(2011) 
Timelines, a political history of the modern world (2012) 
A People's History of London (with Lindsey German) (2012) 
 The Leveller Revolution: Radical Political Organisation in England, 1640-1650 (2017)

References

External links 
John Rees at Socialist Review

1957 births
Living people
British Marxists
British people of Welsh descent
British political party founders
British Trotskyists
British writers
People from Chippenham
Respect Party parliamentary candidates
Socialist Workers Party (UK) members